The 1988–89 Yugoslav Ice Hockey League season was the 47th season of the Yugoslav Ice Hockey League, the top level of ice hockey in Yugoslavia. Six teams participated in the league, and Medveščak have won the championship.

Final ranking
Medveščak
Jesenice
Partizan
Olimpija
Red Star
Vojvodina

External links
Season on eurohockey.com
Yugoslav Ice Hockey League seasons

1988–89
Yugo
1988–89 in Yugoslav ice hockey